Methylomonas is a genus of bacteria that obtain their carbon and energy from methane, a metabolic process called methanotrophy.

References

External links
 Methylomonas J.P. Euzéby: List of Prokaryotic names with Standing in Nomenclature

Gammaproteobacteria